Plasmodium bertii is a parasite of the genus Plasmodium subgenus Papernaia.

Like all Plasmodium species P. bertii has both vertebrate and insect hosts. The vertebrate hosts for this parasite are birds.

Description 

The parasite was first described by Gabaldon and Ulloa in 1981.

Host record

Grey-cowled wood rail (Aramides cajaneus)

References 

bertii
Parasites of birds